Economist Party (in Spanish: Partido Economista), was a political party in Peru. It was founded by Carlos J. Manrique.

Defunct political parties in Peru
Political parties with year of disestablishment missing
Political parties with year of establishment missing